Stephanie Mariel Petit (born 25 August 1996) is an Argentine former tennis player.

Petit has a career-high a singles ranking by the Women's Tennis Association (WTA) of 525, achieved on 12 February 2018. She also has a career-high WTA doubles ranking of 559, achieved on 26 February 2018. She won four ITF doubles titles.

Petit made her Fed Cup debut for Argentina in 2018.

ITF finals

Singles (0–4)

Doubles (4–6)

References

External links
 
 
 

1996 births
Living people
Argentine female tennis players
21st-century Argentine women